Lost in Time is the debut album of AKINO performing under the name "AKINO from bless4". The album comprises all of the songs she performed for the anime series Genesis of Aquarion as well as the theme song for Ōban Star-Racers. It peaked at No. 25 on the Oricon Weekly Album Chart.

Track listing
 – 4:45
Genesis of Aquarion first opening theme
 – 4:49
Aquarion insert song
"Chance to Shine" – 5:45
Ōban Star-Racers Japanese release opening theme
 – 5:42
Aquarion ending theme episode 14
"Go Tight!" – 4:43
Aquarion second opening theme
 – 4:36
Aquarion insert song
 – 4:55
Genesis of Aquarion: Wings of Betrayal ending theme
"Genesis of Aquarion" – 3:13
Bonus track. Aquarion insert song, English lyrics by Bless4

References

External links
Genesis of Aquarion discography

2007 debut albums
Genesis of Aquarion